Swift Falls is an unincorporated community in Swift County, in the U.S. state of Minnesota.

Geography
Swift Falls is located along the Chippewa River. The community contains the Swift Falls Park.

History
A post office called Swift Falls was established in 1873, and remained in operation until 1910.

A tornado touched down in Swift Falls on July 14, 2009, destroying several buildings.

References

Unincorporated communities in Swift County, Minnesota
Unincorporated communities in Minnesota